The Roland E. Cook Elementary School is a historic school building at 412 South Poplar Street in Vinton, Virginia.  Built in 1915 as a T-shaped Classical Revival structure, it was expanded in 1924 to its present H shape, at which time it became Vinton High School.  It served as a high school until 1933, when the William Byrd High School was built, and was then converted to an elementary school.  It originally served the area's white population during the Jim Crow period of segregated facilities, and was integrated in 1966–67.  It closed in 1999, and was mothballed after a period of use by an alternative school.

The school was added to the National Register of Historic Places in 2016.

See also
National Register of Historic Places listings in Roanoke County, Virginia

References

School buildings on the National Register of Historic Places in Virginia
School buildings completed in 1915
Buildings and structures in Roanoke County, Virginia
National Register of Historic Places in Roanoke County, Virginia
1915 establishments in Virginia